"The Sentinel" is a science fiction short story  by British author Arthur C. Clarke, written in 1948 and first published in 1951 as "Sentinel of Eternity", which was used as a starting point for the 1968 novel and film 2001: A Space Odyssey.

Publication history
"The Sentinel" was written in 1948 for a BBC competition (in which it failed to place) and was first published in the magazine 10 Story Fantasy in its Spring 1951 issue, under the title "Sentinel of Eternity". It was subsequently published as part of the short story collections  Expedition to Earth (1953), The Nine Billion Names of God (1967), and The Lost Worlds of 2001 (1972). Despite the story's initial failure, it changed the course of Clarke's career.

Anthology 
The Sentinel (published 1982) is also the title of a collection of Arthur C. Clarke short stories, which includes the eponymous "The Sentinel", "Guardian Angel" (the inspiration for his 1953 novel Childhood's End), "The Songs of Distant Earth", and "Breaking Strain".

Story 
The story deals with the discovery of an artefact on Earth's Moon left behind eons ago by ancient aliens. The object is made of a polished mineral, is tetrahedral in shape, and is surrounded by a spherical force-field. The narrator speculates at one point that the mysterious aliens who left this structure on the Moon may have used mechanisms belonging "to a technology that lies beyond our horizons, perhaps to the technology of para-physical forces."
 
The narrator speculates that for millions of years (evidenced by dust buildup around its force-field) the artefact has been transmitting signals into deep space, but it ceases to transmit when, sometime later, it is destroyed "with the savage might of atomic power". The narrator hypothesizes that this "sentinel" was left on the Moon as a "warning beacon" for possible intelligent and spacefaring species that might develop on Earth.

Reception
Algis Budrys found "The Sentinel" to be infuriating, saying that "one can raise a formidable reputation for profundity by repeating, over and over again, that the universe is wide and man is very small ... while our instruments show that the universe is wide, they are our instruments and we managed somehow to build them. There is no evidence whatsoever that Man is that goddamned small".

Film Adaptation 
The story was adapted and expanded upon in the 1968 film 2001: A Space Odyssey, made by filmmaker Stanley Kubrick. Kubrick and Clarke modified and fused the story with other ideas. Clarke expressed impatience with its common description as the story on which the novel and movie are based. He explained

See also 
Encounter in the Dawn

References

External links 
 
 "Sentinel of Eternity" at the Internet Archive

Short stories by Arthur C. Clarke
Space Odyssey
1951 short stories
Fiction set in 1996
Short stories set on the Moon
Works originally published in American magazines
Works originally published in science fiction magazines
Works originally published in fantasy fiction magazines
Short stories adapted into films
Avon Periodicals titles